Nemoto is a Japanese surname. Notable people with the surname include.

, Japanese gravure idol
, Japanese women's basketball player
, Japanese physicist
, Japanese voice actress
Keisuke Nemoto (born 1979), Japanese karateka
, Japanese women's footballer
, better known as Mie, Japanese singer and actress
, Japanese speed skater
, Japanese actress
, Japanese footballer
, Japanese sport wrestler
, Japanese baseball player
, Japanese French horn player, classical composer, conductor and music educator
, Japanese politician
, Japanese baseball player
, Japanese footballer
Dewi Sukarno (born 1940), Japanese socialite, born Naoko Nemoto

Fictional characters
, a character in the light novel series Baka and Test

See also
Nemoto Station, a railway station in Tajimi, Gifu Prefecture, Japan

Japanese-language surnames